Newry High School is a secondary school in Newry, County Down,  Northern Ireland. It is within the Southern Education and Library Board area. The school was founded as Newry Intermediate School, changing its name to Newry Grammar School in 1948. In 1966 the final name change to Newry High School happened with the merger of Newry Grammar School and Ashgrove Secondary Intermediate School. It is the only non-denominational (non Catholic) post-primary school in Newry.

Sport
Newry High School has a long record of success in boys' hockey, winning the Burney Cup six times and the McCullough Cup once. Newry High School was also the inaugural winner of the Irish Schoolboys' Hockey Championship in 1982, successfully defending the title for the following two years.

The school has strong links with Newry Olympic Hockey Club, who for many years used the school playing pitch at Ashgrove Road. The school currently uses Newry Olympic Hockey Club's artificial playing surface on the Belfast Road.

References

External links
Newry High School Official website

Secondary schools in County Down
Education in Newry